Thomas F. Solon (June 30, 1853 – January 8, 1923) was an American businessman and politician.

Born in the town of Shield, Dodge County, Wisconsin, Solon went to public schools. He was in the real estate and carriage business. He was also in the general merchandise business and served as postmaster in the community of Richwood, Dodge county, Wisconsin. He helped start the Posey Creamery. In 1887 and in 1889, Solon served in the Wisconsin State Assembly and was a Democrat. Solon founded the village Solon Springs, Douglas County, Wisconsin. He was the first non-native person who discovered several springs. He started the Solon Springs Water Company. Solon also served as postmaster for Superior, Wisconsin. He died in Minneapolis, Minnesota at his son's home.

Notes

1853 births
1923 deaths
People from Dodge County, Wisconsin
People from Douglas County, Wisconsin
Businesspeople from Wisconsin
American city founders
Wisconsin postmasters
Democratic Party members of the Wisconsin State Assembly